Khobokh is a rural locality (a selo) in Mazadinsky Selsoviet, Tlyaratinsky District, Republic of Dagestan, Russia. The population was 108 as of 2010.

Geography 
Khobokh is located 24 km north of Tlyarata (the district's administrative centre) by road. Tamuda is the nearest rural locality.

References 

Rural localities in Tlyaratinsky District